Brockford Street is a hamlet in the civil parish of Wetheringsett-cum-Brockford, in the Mid Suffolk district, in the county of Suffolk, England, sited upon the A140 road between Ipswich and Norwich. Nearby is Brockford Station, part of The Mid-Suffolk Light Railway which closed under B.R. in 1952. The Mid-Suffolk Light Railway Museum is located at the site of the old cattle dock. Brockford was recorded in the Domesday Book of 1086 as Brocfort.

References

External links

Renaissance

Hamlets in Suffolk
Mid Suffolk District